The Roman Catholic Diocese of Bougainville is  a suffragan diocese of the Roman Catholic Archdiocese of Rabaul. It was erected as the Prefecture Apostolic of German Solomon Islands in 1898 and elevated to a Vicariate Apostolic in 1930. It was further elevated in 1966 to the Diocese of Bougainville.

The diocesan cathedral is the Our Lady of the Assumption Cathedral, Buka. It was previously the Church of St. Michael the Archangel at the former Tubiana mission.

Bishops

Ordinaries
Maurizio Boch, S. M. (1920–1929) 
Thomas James Wade, S. M. (1930–1960) 
Leo Lemay, S. M. (1960–1974) 
Gregory Singkai (1974–1996)
Henk Kronenberg, S. M. (1999–2009)
Bernard Unabali (2009–2019)
Dariusz Kałuża (2020–present)

Auxiliary bishop
Bernard Unabali (2006-2009), appointed Bishop here

Other priest of this diocese who became bishop
Peter Kurongku, appointed Auxiliary Bishop of Honiara, Solomon Islands in 1978

External links and references

References

Catholic Church in the Autonomous Region of Bougainville
Bougainville